In Greek mythology, Immaradus ( Immarados) was a Thracian prince as the son of King Eumolpus of Thrace and the Oceanid Daeira.

Mythology 
During the war between Eleusis and Athens, Immaradus led the Thracian armies on the side of Eleusis. He was killed by Erechtheus, king of Athens.

Notes

References 

 Pausanias, Description of Greece with an English Translation by W.H.S. Jones, Litt.D., and H.A. Ormerod, M.A., in 4 Volumes. Cambridge, MA, Harvard University Press; London, William Heinemann Ltd. 1918. . Online version at the Perseus Digital Library
 Pausanias, Graeciae Descriptio. 3 vols. Leipzig, Teubner. 1903.  Greek text available at the Perseus Digital Library.
 Titus Flavius Clemens, Exhortation against the Pagans translated by Butterworth, G W. Loeb Classical Library Volume 92. Cambridge, MA. Harvard Universrity Press. 1919. Online version at theio.com

Princes in Greek mythology
Thracian characters in Greek mythology
Eleusinian mythology
Attic mythology
Greek mythology of Thrace